Ronald Greer may refer to:
 J. Ronnie Greer (born 1952), United States federal judge
 Ron Greer (Wisconsin politician), Wisconsin politician
 Ronald Greer (Stargate), a character in Stargate Universe